Frederick William Faller (July 30, 1895 – August 11, 1984) was an American long-distance runner who competed at the 1920 Summer Olympics. He finished eighth in the 10,000 m, 15th in the individual cross-country and fourth in the team cross-country event. Faller won the AAU 10 mile and cross-country titles in 1919–20, and finished second in the 10 mile race at the 1919 Inter-Allied Games. Faller's AAU record held for 25 years.

He was inducted to the Road Runners Club of America's American Long Distance Running Hall of Fame in 1972.

He was also a watchmaker and one of Johnny Kelley's advisors.

References

1895 births
1984 deaths
People from Schwarzwald-Baar-Kreis
Sportspeople from Freiburg (region)
German emigrants to the United States
American male long-distance runners
Olympic track and field athletes of the United States
Athletes (track and field) at the 1920 Summer Olympics
Olympic cross country runners
20th-century American people